Dhaligaon is a town area inside of Bongaigaon district city, India. This is the one of major place of Bongaigaon district.

Bongaigaon Refinery
The refinery of Bongaigaon Refinery and Petrochemicals Limited is located in this area.

BGR Township
The quarter campus of the employees of IOCL-BGR. There are two schools in the township, one is BGR HS School and another is Delhi Public School.

References

Cities and towns in Bongaigaon district
Bongaigaon
Neighbourhoods in Bongaigaon